The Paloma O'Shea Santander International Piano Competition (in Spanish: Concurso Internacional de Piano de Santander "Paloma O'Shea") is a piano competition taking place in Santander, Spain. Founded in 1972 by Paloma O'Shea as a national prize, it turned into an international competition in its 2nd edition, and was professionalized in the mid-70s, being accepted into the World Federation of International Music Competitions in 1976.

Organized by the Albéniz Foundation and chaired by the Infanta Margarita and sponsored by a network of  civil service and private companies, it arranges an extensive world tour for the winners, including debuts in auditoriums such as the National Auditorium of Music and the Wigmore Hall and cash prizes. The competition takes place in the Palacio de Festivales de Cantabria.

The competition
Currently, 20 pianists are accepted into the competition through a demanding shortlist of candidates. The competition consists of a preliminary round after a video-based admission round (pre-auditions in Spain, Paris, New York and Moscow), a recital round, a chamber music round, and final concerto round with a symphony orchestra.

Guest artists
During the last stages of the competition, the participants perform with guest artists and ensembles. Past ensembles include the London Symphony Orchestra, Dresden Philharmonic, Spanish National Orchestra, Madrid Symphony Orchestra, Northern Sinfonia, Scottish Chamber Orchestra, RTVE Symphony Orchestra  Takacs Quartet, Ysaÿe Quartet, Quiroga Quartet and the Vienna Chamber Orchestra and conductors Philippe Entremont, Sergiu Comissiona, Miguel Ángel Gómez Martínez, and Jesús López-Cobos.

Juries
Members of the jury have included Josep Colom, Gary Graffman, Federico Mompou, Vlado Perlemuter, Joaquín Achúcarro, Aldo Ciccolini, Nikita Magaloff, Paul Badura-Skoda, Hiroko Nakamura, Fou Ts'ong, Eliso Virsaladze, Elisabeth Leonskaja, Rafael Orozco, Philippe Entremont, Alicia de Larrocha, Dimitri Bashkirov, Dimitri Alexeev, Akiko Ebi, Márta Gulyás and Arie Vardi.

Prize winners

This is a partial listing of prize-winners of the Paloma O'Shea International Piano Competition.

Special prizes

Grant-prizes

See also
 Albéniz Foundation
 Escuela Superior de Música Reina Sofía
 List of classical music competitions
 Paloma O'Shea (founder of the competition)*

References

External links
 Albeniz Foundation
 Paloma O'Shea Santander Piano Competition

 
 
Cantabrian culture
Albéniz Foundation
Music competitions in Spain
Piano competitions